Brosterfield is a hamlet in Derbyshire, England. It is located close to Foolow, where the road to that village joins the A623 road.

Hamlets in Derbyshire
Derbyshire Dales